Loveshhuda is a 2016 Indian romance film produced by Vijay and Pratik Galani, and directed by Vaibhav Mishra. The film features Girish Kumar, Navneet Kaur Dhillon and Naveen Kasturia in leading roles. The film was scheduled for release on 5 February 2016, but the release date was postponed to 19 February 2016.

Plot
Gaurav Mehra (Girish Kumar) is an obedient man who stays in London and is getting ready for his wedding to Vandana who is dominating and finicky by nature. His friends arrive for the marriage and host a bachelor's party, which goes awry when a sloshed Gaurav wakes up with a girl Pooja (Navneet Kaur Dhillon). Gaurav being an obedient and well-behaved boy asks Pooja to leave but unable to find her clothes, she ends up wearing a shirt that Gaurav offers which incidentally has been gifted to him by his to-be mother-in-law for his upcoming engagement. He realises the mistake only when Pooja is gone and then starts his search. Though fuzzy about the details of the previous night, he finally meets Pooja who tells him what exactly transpired the night they were together. Going down the memory lane, which is clubbed with numerous lectures by Pooja on how to live life, Gaurav falls in love with the free-spirited girl. But Gaurav doesn't acknowledge his feelings and ends up marrying Vandana. After a quick jump of four years, Gaurav is divorced and is relentlessly blaming his elder sister (Tisca Chopra) for everything that has gone wrong in his life. To help Gaurav, his friend suggests going to Mauritius for a vacation. For a break, he lies to his sisters saying that he is going to a business trip, whereas he went to Mauritius with his friends. As luck would have it, Gaurav once again meets Pooja. But now the scenario is reversed; Pooja is set to marry Vinayak Sengupta, a proposal which she had accepted. They both spend more time together only till Pooja realises Gaurav loves her. She tells him about her engagement and urges him to forget her. Gaurav goes back home and has a fight with his sisters. He goes to meet Pooja at her home when he gets her wedding card in his house. There, he meets Vandana and spoils her makeup as a revenge. He then turns to Pooja and requests her to meet him. They meet after the function is over. Pooja asks him to buy her a whiskey and they both started drinking, only ended up spoiling Pooja's father's pots in the front lawn and sleeping with each other for the second time.

Pooja requests Gaurav to leave and never meet her again. Gaurav leaves. At a dhaba, Gaurav notices that the baraat had come back which meant that Pooja broke the alliance. He reunites with her.

Cast
 Girish Kumar as Gaurav Mehra
 Tisca Chopra as Gaurav's eldest sister
 Navneet Kaur Dhillon as Pooja
 Naveen Kasturia as Kunal (Gaurav's childhood friend)
 Sachin Khedekar as Pooja's father
 Yash Pandit as Vinayak SenGupta (Pooja's fiancé)
 Farida Dadi as Pooja's grandmother
 Meenakshi Sethi as Pooja's mother
 Devyani as Neha (Pooja's cousin)
 Benaf Dadachanji as Gaurav's elder sister
 Kiran Thapar as Geeta (Pooja's friend)
 Savant Singh Premi as Aashish (Gaurav's childhood friend)
 Zaq Qureshi as Rana Singh
 Sachin Parikh as Gaurav's brother-in-law

Music

Mar Jaayen (composed by Mithoon, sung by Atif Aslam and lyrics by Sayeed Quadri) was released on 16 October as the first song of the film.

Box office
The movie witnessed 30% occupancy throughout the country and the revenue remained stagnant during the weekend. In five days, it made just . In its first week it grossed .

References

External links

2016 films
Indian romance films
2010s Hindi-language films
2016 romance films
Hindi-language romance films